Jantien Cabout (born 10 January 1988) is a Dutch water polo player.

She was part of the Dutch team at the 2011 World Aquatics Championships,

Her sisters Mieke Cabout and Harriët Cabout and her grandfather Joop Cabout also played water polo for the national team.

See also
 Netherlands at the 2011 World Aquatics Championships

References

External links 

1988 births
Living people
Dutch female water polo players